Lupoaia may refer to several places in Romania:

 Lupoaia, a village in Holod Commune, Bihor County
 Lupoaia, a village in Cătunele Commune, Gorj County
 Lupoaia, a village in Creaca Commune, Sălaj County
 Lupoaia, a village in Pesceana Commune, Vâlcea County
 Lupoaia, a village in Dumitrești Commune, Vrancea County
 Lupoaia (Motru), a tributary of the Motru in Gorj County
 Lupoaia, a tributary of the Suciu in Maramureș County

See also 
 Lupu (disambiguation)
 Lupșa (disambiguation)
 Lupești (disambiguation)